Ropinirole, sold under the brand name Requip among others, is a medication used to treat Parkinson's disease (PD) and restless legs syndrome (RLS). In PD the dose needs to be adjusted to the effect and treatment should not be suddenly stopped. It is taken by mouth.

Common side effects include sleepiness, vomiting, and dizziness. Serious side effects may include pathological gambling, low blood pressure with standing and hallucinations. Use in pregnancy and breastfeeding is of unclear safety. It is a dopamine agonist and works by triggering dopamine D2 receptors.

It was approved for medical use in the United States in 1997. It is available as a generic medication. In 2020, it was the 156th most commonly prescribed medication in the United States, with more than 3million prescriptions.

Medical uses
Ropinirole is prescribed for mainly Parkinson's disease, RLS and extrapyramidal symptoms. It can also reduce the side effects caused by selective serotonin reuptake inhibitors, including Parkinsonism syndrome as well as sexual dysfunction and erectile dysfunction caused by either SSRIs or antipsychotics.

Dosage 
Ropinirole is available in various preparations, ranging from a 0.25 mg tablet to a 5 mg tablet. The primary reason is dose titration. Prolonged-release tablets are available in 2-8 mg doses.

For Parkinson's disease, the maximum recommended dose is 24 mg per day, taken in three separate doses spread throughout the day for the immediate-release formulation. The maximum dose recommendations of ropinirole for subjects with end stage renal disease (ESRD) should be reduced by 25% compared with those recommended for subjects with normal renal function. A 25% dose reduction represents a more straightforward dosage regimen in terms of available tablet strength, compared with a 30% dose reduction.

For RLS, the maximum recommended dose is 4 mg per day, taken 1 to 3 hours before bedtime.  A 52-week open label study had a mean dosage of 1.90 mg, once daily 1 to 3 hours before bedtime.

Side effects 
Ropinirole can cause nausea, dizziness, hallucinations, orthostatic hypotension, and sudden sleep attacks during the daytime. Unusual side effects specific to D3 agonists such as ropinirole and pramipexole can include hypersexuality, punding and compulsive gambling, even in patients without a history of these behaviours.

Ropinirole is also known to cause an effect known as "augmentation" when used to treat restless legs syndrome, where over time treatment with dopamine agonists will cause RLS symptoms to become more severe. This usually leads to constant dosage increases in an attempt to offset the symptom progression. Symptoms will return to the level of severity they were experienced at before treatment was initiated if the drug is stopped; however, both ropinirole and pramipexole are known to cause painful withdrawal effects when treatment is stopped and the process of taking a patient who has been using the medication long-term off of these drugs is often very difficult and generally should be supervised by a medical professional.

Pharmacology 
Ropinirole acts as a D2, D3, and D4 dopamine receptor agonist with highest affinity for D3, which are mostly found in the limbic areas. It is weakly active at the 5-HT2, and α2 receptors and is said to have virtually no affinity for the 5-HT1, GABA, mAChRs, α1, and β-adrenoreceptors.

Ropinirole is metabolized primarily by cytochrome P450 CYP1A2 to form two metabolites; SK&F-104557 and SK&F-89124, both of which are renally excreted, and at doses higher than clinical, is also metabolized by CYP3A4. At doses greater than 24 mg, CYP2D6 may be inhibited, although this has been tested only in vitro.

Society and culture
It is manufactured by GlaxoSmithKline (GSK), Mylan Pharmaceuticals, Cipla, Dr. Reddy's Laboratories and Sun Pharmaceutical. The discovery of the drug's utility in RLS has been used as an example of successful drug repurposing.

Lawsuits
In November 2012, GlaxoSmithKline was ordered by a Rennes appeals court to pay Frenchman Didier Jambart 197,000 euros ($255,824); Jambart had taken ropinirole from 2003 to 2010 and exhibited risky hypersexual behavior and gambled excessively until stopping the medication.

References

External links 
 
 

Amines
Dopamine agonists
Indolines
Lactams
GSK plc brands
Aphrodisiacs
Wikipedia medicine articles ready to translate